A Day of Fury is a 1956 American Western film directed by Harmon Jones and starring Dale Robertson, Mara Corday and Jock Mahoney.

Plot
A gunslinger named Jagade happens upon a stranger in trouble on the trail and saves his life. Jagade immediately regrets it upon learning the man is Alan Burnett, who is not only a U.S. Marshal but on his way to the town of West End to marry Jagade's former sweetheart that very day.

Jagade gets to town first and disrupts the proceedings. He taunts the betrothed woman, Sharman Fulton, in public. She was once a dancehall girl of low repute, but has since been taken into the home of the honorable Judge John J. McLean and has redeemed her reputation. Preacher Jason, nevertheless, calls off the wedding after Jagade sullies her name.

Burnett arrives but has no call to arrest Jagade and remains indebted for the gunfighter's aid on the trail. Jagade provokes him and the town, forcing open the saloon on a Sunday and re-importing the saloon girls against the town's regulation.  This infuriates the townspeople, including the meek Miss Timmons and the Preacher, who now intends to burn the saloon down. Because of Marshal Burnett's failure to immediately run Jagade out of town and Sharman's going to the saloon to ask Jagade to leave town, the judge kicks Sharman out of his house.  Marshal Burnett shoots the judge in the arm to try to keep him from getting killed by trying to arrest Jagade.  This causes the judge to swear out a warrant and jail Burnett.  With no where else to go, Sharman moves into the saloon and agrees to Jagade's condition that she don her red dancehall costume of old.

Billy Brand, a young resident of the town who admires Jagade, shoots the preacher. But he is overcome with remorse when Miss Timmons, who has been humiliated by Jagade, hangs herself.  Realizing that only the marshal can take on Jagade, the judge orders him released from jail.   A church bell distracts Jagade during a shootout and Burnett's bullet fatally wounds him. As he dies, Jagade realizes the bell was rung in honor of the preacher who opposed him and was killed by Billy..

Cast
 Dale Robertson as Jagade
 Mara Corday as Sharman
 Jock Mahoney as Burnett
 Carl Benton Reid as Judge McLean
 Jan Merlin as Billy
 John Dehner as Preacher Jason
 Dee Carroll as Miss Timmons
 Sheila Bromley as Marie
 James Bell as Doc Logan
 Dani Crayne as Claire
 Howard Wendell as Vanryzin
 Charles Cane as Duggen
 Phil Chambers as Burson
 Sydney Mason as Beemans
 Helen Kleeb as Mrs. McLean

See also
 List of American films of 1956

External links
 
 
 

1956 films
1956 Western (genre) films
American Western (genre) films
1950s English-language films
1950s American films
Universal Pictures films